Mirosława may refer to:

Lucyna Mirosława Falkowska (1951–2021), Polish scientist and oceanographer
Miroslawa Danuta Golos (born 1949), the wife of the former President of Poland Lech Wałęsa
Mirosława Jastrzębska (born 1921), Polish scientist, ethnographer, and museum curator
Mirosława Krajewska (born 1940), Polish actress
Mirosława Litmanowicz (1928–2017), Polish chess player
Mirosława Makuchowska, Polish LGBT rights activist
Mirosława Masłowska (born 1943), Polish politician
Mirosława Sagun-Lewandowska (born 1970), multiple air gun champion of Poland
Mirosława Sarna (born 1942), Polish former track and field athlete
Mirosława Stachowiak-Różecka (born 1973), Polish politician
Mirosława Zakrzewska-Kotula (1932–1985), Polish player of volleyball, basketball and handball

See also
Mirosław (disambiguation)